The 1932 season of the Venezuelan Primera División, the top category of Venezuelan football, was played by 9 teams. The national champions were Unión.

Results

Standings

External links
Venezuela 1932 season at RSSSF

Ven
Venezuelan Primera División seasons
1932 in Venezuelan sport